Meskie Shibru-Sivan (born September 22, 1967) is an Israeli actress, director, writer and vocalist.

Biography
Meskie was born in Ethiopia under the name Miskraam Lagasa. Her mother was a Prisoner of Zion and was sent to the Ethiopean prison for two years because she helped Jews migrate to Israel. She came to Israel without her family, except her sister, in 1985, when she was 16 years old. Supposedly she came to study computer science, but instead she studied acting at the Nissan Nativ School of Acting in Tel Aviv. Her family followed later.

She participated in many television shows, films, and concerts. Some of these were related to her Ethiopian roots.

In 1999, she played the role of Inbal in an episode of the Israeli TV series Zinzana and herself in an episode of the children's series Parparim (Butterflies).

Shibru-Sivan acted as Shlomo's mother in the 2005 French-Belgian-Israeli-Italian film "Va, vis et deviens" (English title: Go, Live, and Become).

In 2017 she starred in a supporting role in the hit Israeli series, Nevsu, winner of the International Emmy Award for the comedy series of 2018. It premiered on Netflix in 2022 during its second season.

References

External links
 
  Shibru-Sivan at Mooma
  Article on Shibru-Sivan in La'isha weekly
  Interview with Shibru-Sivan at E! Online

1967 births
Living people
Ethiopian emigrants to Israel
Israeli people of Ethiopian-Jewish descent
21st-century Israeli women singers
Israeli film actresses
Jewish Israeli actresses
Israeli stage actresses
Israeli television actresses